Jervis Bay Nuclear Power Plant was a proposed nuclear power reactor in the Jervis Bay Territory on the south coast of New South Wales. It would have been Australia's first nuclear power plant, and was the only proposal to have received serious consideration . Some environmental studies and site works were completed, and two rounds of tenders were called and evaluated, but the Australian government decided not to proceed with the project.

Background to the project
In 1969 the Australian government proposed to the New South Wales government that a 500 MWe nuclear power station should be built on Commonwealth territory and connected to the New South Wales grid, electricity generation and distribution being a state responsibility under the Australian constitution. Possible sites were the Australian Capital Territory and Jervis Bay. The plan, supported by the Australian Atomic Energy Commission, was for a design of reactor that could generate weapons-grade plutonium, possibly reflecting Australia's long-term post-World War II interest in acquiring nuclear weapons.

In December 1969 invitations to express interest in the construction of a nuclear power plant at Jervis Bay were sent to fourteen organisations. Tender documents were issued the following February, with tenders closing the following June. Fourteen tenders were received from seven different organisations. About 70 staff were involved full-time in evaluating tenders, principally from the Australian Atomic Energy Commission and the Electricity Commission of New South Wales, and more than 150 others had a significant part-time role. As a result, a recommendation was written for the acceptance of the tender to supply a 600 MWe Steam generating heavy water reactor (SGHWR), from the British organisation The Nuclear Power Group.

The abandonment of the proposal

Before this recommendation was made, however, there was a change of prime minister (although not of government). John Gorton had been a supporter of the project. However, he was replaced as Prime Minister by William McMahon. McMahon opposed the nuclear power program, and the project was deferred for a year, citing financial constraints – Treasury prepared the first comprehensive comparative cost analysis in 1971 and concluded that nuclear was going to be far more expensive than a conventional coal plant. Following the discovery of natural gas and oil in Bass Strait, and the development of economic coal resources, most of the energy security incentive had evaporated. Tenders were re-called, only to be again deferred and in practical terms cancelled in June 1971. Organisations like the World Union for Protection of Life, the Ecology Action and the Society for Responsibility in Science had reported about the dangers connected with the nuclear power plant.

Some land clearing was done in preparation for the construction, and concrete footings were installed. The footings are visible to this day.

See also

 High Flux Australian Reactor - Australia's first nuclear reactor
 Nuclear power in Australia

References

Further reading

External links
 ANSTO: A Brief History (1948 - 2002).
Chronology -- Australia's nuclear political history

Proposed power stations in Australia
Unfinished nuclear reactors
History of Australia (1945–present)
Jervis Bay Territory